This Is the Life is a solo album from Scottish rock musician Ricky Ross, a member of Deacon Blue.

Ross produced the album with Kenny MacDonald, who had produced for Deacon Blue in the past. The album has more touches of folk and country music and the general mood of the album is more placid than most of the Deacon Blue catalog.

Deacon Blue colleague James Prime plays piano on "The Way to Work", and Ross' wife and Deacon Blue colleague Lorraine McIntosh contributes vocals to one song (as she did on each of Ross' three prior solo albums), "Nothing Cures That".

This is the first Ricky Ross solo album to receive a US release.

Track listing
All songs written by Ricky Ross, except where noted.

"Northern Soul" (Ross, Charlie Dore) – 6:34
"London Comes Alive" (Ross, Mick Slaven) – 3:33
"Rodeo Boy" (Ross, Davie Scott) – 4:32
"Angel and Mercedes" (Ross, Slaven) – 5:05
"I Sing About You" (Ross, Slaven) – 4:28
"Nothing Cures That" – 4:26
"This Is the Life" – 6:01
"Threatening Rain" – 3:05
"Starring Love" – 3:56
"Hippy Girl" – 3:48
"My Girl Going to Town" (Ross, Scott) – 5:13
"Looking for My Own Lone Ranger" (Ross, Dore) – 2:29
"The Way to Work" – 4:54

Bonus download track
"Driving George" – 3:58 (No longer available as URL no longer active)

Personnel
Ricky Ross - vocals, guitar, percussion, piano, wurlitzer, synthesizer
Davie Scott - piano, bass guitar, keyboards, glockenspiel, percussion, backing vocals
Mick Slaven - guitar, mandolin
Jim Gash - drums
Scott Fraser - bass guitar
Simon Clarke - baritone saxophone, alto saxophone on "Nothing Cures That"
Tim Sanders - tenor saxophone on "Nothing Cures That"
Roddy Lorimer - trumpet on "Nothing Cures That"
Annie Whitehead - trombone on "Nothing Cures That"
Jacqui Penfold - viola on "Looking for My Own Lone Ranger"
Jo Sutherland - violin on "Looking for My Own Lone Ranger"
Alastair Savage - violin on "Looking for My Own Lone Ranger"
Amanda Shearman - cello on "Looking for My Own Lone Ranger"
James Prime - piano on "The Way to Work"
Lorraine McIntosh - backing vocals on "Nothing Cures That"

1997 albums
Ricky Ross (musician) albums
Chrysalis Records albums